Rhynchospora chapmanii, known by the common name of Chapman's beaksedge, is a member of the sedge family, Cyperaceae. It is a perennial herb, found in wetlands of the southeastern United States from North Carolina to Louisiana, as well as in Belize, Cuba, Honduras, and Nicaragua.

Rhynchospora chapmanii grows up to 28 inches tall, and is a common invasive species in pine savannas that have been recently logged or otherwise disturbed. Its brown spikelets bloom from June through November.

References

External links

chapmanii
Flora of the Southeastern United States
Flora of Belize
Flora of Cuba
Flora of Honduras
Flora of Nicaragua
Plants described in 1841
Taxa named by Moses Ashley Curtis